Richard Fried (born 8 March 1899, date of death unknown) was an Austrian footballer. He played in one match for the Austria national football team in 1924.

References

External links
 

1899 births
Year of death missing
Austrian footballers
Austria international footballers
Place of birth missing
Association footballers not categorized by position